Leslie Hughes may refer to:
Leslie Mark Hughes (born 1963), Welsh footballer and manager
Les Hughes (born 1884), Australian rules footballer 
Lesley Hughes, Canadian politician